Sparebanken Øst is a Norwegian savings bank, headquartered in Drammen, Norway. The banks main market is
the eastern part of Norway. The bank was established in 1843.

References

Banks of Norway
Companies based in Drammen
Banks established in 1843
Companies listed on the Oslo Stock Exchange
Norwegian companies established in 1843